Lochbroom FM is a radio station based in Ullapool, Wester Ross which  in the Highlands of Scotland.

A community radio association was formed in 1994. They broadcast in 1995 using a three-month temporary commercial radio licence from a small tin shack with a transmission radius of 20 miles. A further two-month licence let them broadcast in 1996, and then a full eight-year licence came into operation at the end of May 1997.

A purpose-built station was proposed, which was to be funded through a variety of grants. In 1996, it was announced that they had secured £45,000 of lottery funding towards the purchase and fitting out of a new building.

Lochbroom FM launched on 23 May 1997.  The studio opened in September 1998.

In 2012 the station started to use neighbouring commercial station Two Lochs Radio as its sustaining service. In 2020, broadcasting regulator Ofcom formally transferred the Lochbroom FM licence to Wester Ross Radio Ltd, the company that also holds the Two Lochs Radio licence.

References

External links
 Lochbroom FM official website

Mass media in Highland (council area)
Radio stations in Scotland
Radio stations in the Highlands & Islands